John MacLennan Buchanan  (April 22, 1931 – October 3, 2019) was a Canadian lawyer and former politician who served as the 20th premier of Nova Scotia from 1978 to 1990 and as a member of the Senate of Canada from 1990 to 2006.

Early life

Buchanan was born in Sydney, Nova Scotia, the son of Flora Isabel Campbell and Murdoch William Buchanan. He graduated from Mount Allison University in 1954 with a Bachelor of Science degree and a Certificate in Engineering. He then went on to study at Dalhousie Law School and after graduating in 1958 entered the practice of law where he was appointed Queen's Counsel in 1972 and awarded Doctorates from Nova Scotia Technical College, Mount Allison University, Saint Mary's University, St. Francis Xavier University, and Université Saint Anne.

Political career
Buchanan was elected as a Member of the Nova Scotia Legislative Assembly in 1967, re-elected in 1970, 1974, 1978, 1981, 1984 and 1988. He was appointed to the Executive Council of Nova Scotia as Minister of Public Works and Fisheries in 1969. He was elected leader of the Progressive Conservative Party of Nova Scotia in 1971. Buchanan was elected as Premier of Nova Scotia in 1978. He was re-elected in 1981, 1984 and 1988, becoming the third Premier in Nova Scotia to be elected to four consecutive terms (following George Henry Murray and Robert Stanfield), and the fourth longest serving premier in the history of the province. On April 17, 1982, Buchanan was made a member of Her Majesty’s Privy Council. His biggest majority came in the 1984 election, when he led his party to victory, capturing 42 of the 52 seats in the legislature.
 
Buchanan resigned as Premier when he was appointed to the Senate of Canada by Brian Mulroney on September 12, 1990. Buchanan sat as a Progressive Conservative senator until 2004, when the party merged with the Canadian Alliance. He sat as a member of the Conservative Party of Canada from 2004 until his retirement at age 75 on April 22, 2006.

After Buchanan resigned as premier, it was revealed that he had secretly received $431,290 in funds in addition to his salary. A subsequent RCMP investigation concluded that there was no evidence to support criminal charges.

Political views 
In 1990, Buchanan stated that if Quebec were to secede from Canada, separating English-speaking Canada into two parts, the Atlantic provinces would be "absurd" to try to form their own country, and there would be "no choice" but to seek to join the United States. He retracted his statement after criticism. However, an American author, Donald Nuechterlein, similarly stated in 2001 that as the Maritime provinces require substantial transfer payments from Ottawa, they would not be a viable independent country. He speculated that they might combine, with or without Newfoundland, to make themselves more attractive for admission into the United States as a single state.

Personal life
He married Mavis Forsyth in September 1954, and they had five children. Buchanan died on October 3, 2019 at the age of 88.

References

Further reading
 Kavanagh, Peter. John Buchanan: The Art of Political Survival (1988). Formac Publishing Company Limited.

External links 
 

1931 births
2019 deaths
Canadian people of Scottish descent
Canadian senators from Nova Scotia
Conservative Party of Canada senators
Schulich School of Law alumni
Members of the King's Privy Council for Canada
Members of the United Church of Canada
Mount Allison University alumni
Lawyers in Nova Scotia
People from Sydney, Nova Scotia
Premiers of Nova Scotia
Progressive Conservative Association of Nova Scotia MLAs
Progressive Conservative Party of Canada senators
Canadian King's Counsel
21st-century Canadian politicians
Nova Scotia political party leaders